Mniszków may refer to the following places in Poland:
Mniszków, Lower Silesian Voivodeship (south-west Poland)
Mniszków, Łódź Voivodeship (central Poland)